Elisabethszell is a parish village (Pfarrdorf) in the municipality of Haibach in the Lower Bavarian county of Straubing-Bogen in Germany.

History 
In 1346 in the place then known as Atzenzell, which belonged to the parish (Pfarrei) of Haselbach, a priory of Benedictine abbey of Oberalteich was established. It existed, with interruptions, until church land in Bavaria was seized in 1803.

In 1498 the Benedictines were driven out by the Paulsdorfs at Falkenfels Castle. It was the Countess of Schwarzenberg, whose had inherited Elisabethszell from her forebears, who allowed Oberalteich Abbey to buy back the priory estates for a moderate sum in 1621, whereupon the clergy returned to Elisabethszell.

Secularisation in Bavaria in 1803 spelt the end of the priory at Elisabethszell. In 1805, Elisabethszell, hitherto part of the parish of Haselbach, became an independent parish. The priory was given by the state to the municipality of Elisabethszell for the establishment of a school. On 11 July 1877 the newly built parish church was consecrated by Bishop Ignatius von Senestrey.

The old cemetery was closed in 1967 and turned into a car park in the 1970s. A new cemetery was created above the Pfarrhof. With municipal reforms in Bavaria, the former municipality of Elisabethszell lost its independence and was incorporated on 1 January 1978 into Haibach.

Population growth

Sights 
 Parish church of St. Elisabeth. It was built from 1834 to 1837 to replace a demolished predecessor church. The church furnishings were completed between 1870 and 1875.

Societies 
 Elisabethszell Volunteer Fire Service (Freiwillige Feuerwehr Elisabethszell), founded in 1878.

External links 

 Monumenta Elisabetcellensia
 Website der Gemeinde Haibach-Elisabethszell Ortsdatenbank

References 

Straubing-Bogen